Ossie Stewart is an American former Negro league pitcher who played in the 1940s.

Stewart played for the Baltimore Elite Giants in 1943. In four recorded appearances on the mound, he posted a 12.71 ERA over 11.1 innings.

References

External links
 and Seamheads

Year of birth missing
Place of birth missing
Baltimore Elite Giants players
Baseball pitchers